Lucky Lager is an American lager with U.S. brewing and distribution rights held by the Pabst Brewing Company. Originally launched in 1934 by the San Francisco-based General Brewing Company, Lucky Lager grew to be one of the prominent beers of the Western United States during the 1950s and 1960s. In 2019, Pabst announced that the beer brand would be revived and would be brewed by 21st Amendment Brewery, a brewery based in San Leandro.

History

Origins 
The General Brewing Company was founded in San Francisco, California by Eugene Selvage (who would remain owner and CEO until 1961). Eugene teamed up with Paul C. von Gontard, a grandson of Aldophus Busch, and German brewmaster Julius Kerber, to launch a state of the art brewery that could brew beer that rivalled those made in Europe. Lucky Lager, the first beer of General Brewing Company, was commercially introduced in 1934. That same year, General Brewing Company also formed a strategic partnership with Coast Breweries in Vancouver Island, British Columbia as part of a consortium of several Canadian breweries. The General Brewing company expanded and opened Lucky Lager Brewing Company, a second brewery in Azusa, California in 1949. Later in the 1950s and 1960s, the expansion also reached Vancouver, Washington and Salt Lake City (UT).

"One of the World’s Finest Beers" 
Lucky Lager was launched in San Francisco via a series of newspaper ads, billboards, and advertisements on street cars. The ads announced Lucky would be a beer of high quality and would follow the tradition of German beers - being made with high-quality ingredients, in a high-quality brewery, and with thorough aging. It was launched to significant fanfare and grew steadily, becoming the #2 selling beer in California by 1937. Starting in 1935, Lucky encouraged people to take the taste test and that they would choose Lucky.

The General Brewing Company invested $1,000,000 to open its first brewery in San Francisco. It was planned and designed by Frederick H. Meyer, San Francisco architect, in partnership with George L. Lehle, a brewery engineer from Chicago. This construction was the most modern brewery of its time, with a capacity of 100,000 barrels per year and capabilities of doubling production. By brewing just Lucky Lager, the General Brewing Company achieved a record of selling its entire daily production since the beginning of operations. The main reason for its success with consumers was the high beer quality, which came from aging the beer adequately, unlike many of its post-Prohibition competitors of the time. Moreover, the production was set up in a way that no hands touched the beer or its container until the final step (bottling). In that sense, General Brewing Company posted a bond of $1,000 as a guarantee that the age-date of the beer was authentic.

After WWII, General Brewing began rapid expansion to meet increasing demand. This included expanding into Azusa, California in 1949, Vancouver, Washington, Washington in 1950, and Salt Lake City, Utah in 1960.

At the same time, the Maier Brewery was producing Brew 102, a favorite beer in post-war Southern California.

1950s – 1960s heydays 
The following decade, from 1950 to 1960 saw Lucky Lager grow to be the sales leader in the entire Western region. This was coupled with continued distribution expansion in an effort to saturate the western market. By 1962, Lucky Lager was producing and selling over two million barrels of beer per year.

In 1958, Coast Breweries was purchased by Canadian Labatt Brewery, which continued to brew Lucky Lager.

Lucky Lager Brewing Company changed its name back to General Brewing between 1963 and 1969 and then changed its name to Lucky Breweries, Inc. in 1969. As the national brands moved into California in the early 1960s, Lucky Lager's sales began to falter. In an effort to increase sales with younger drinkers, this led to the ill-fated introduction of King Snedley's Beer, an alternate brand in addition to Lucky. According to some accounts, King Snedley's was just Lucky Lager repackaged with a different brand and marketed toward counterculture consumers. The new brand flopped and was withdrawn from the market, though it would reappear briefly in 1975. As sales continued to decline, the Salt Lake City brewery was closed in 1967.

1970s and beyond 
In 1971, millionaire beer baron Paul Kalmanovitz bought Lucky Lager Brewing and merged it with Maier Brewing Company to form the General Brewing Company with S&P Corporation as its parent.

The Azusa, California brewery was closed immediately. The San Francisco brewery was closed in 1978. This left Vancouver, Washington and Cranston, Rhode Island as the only locations where Lucky Lager was brewed. In the late 1970s, General Brewing took advantage of the "generic brand" marketing craze in the US by producing beer with plain white labels emblazoned with the word BEER. Rumors surfaced that BEER was simply repackaged Lucky Lager. When the generic craze died, and the microbrewery movement took off, General had difficulty maintaining profitability as a brewer of inexpensive beers. The fact that Lucky Lager tasted no worse than expensively-advertised "premium" brands such as Budweiser or Miller did not impress a market of drinkers where image was frequently more important than taste. The brewery's fortunes began to decline.

After the Vancouver, Washington brewery shut down in July 1985, the Olympia Brewing Company in Tumwater, Washington began to produce Lucky Lager in the US. In July 2003, this brewery was also closed. Lucky Lager continued to be sold in its original Northern California range at Lucky Stores supermarkets, which although not affiliated, sold Lucky Lager as an unofficial value store brand, until Lucky Stores supermarkets were bought out by Albertson's and the name of the supermarkets was changed around 2000.

Past Canadian Presence 
Lucky was actually brewed on Vancouver Island in Victoria until 1982 when Labatt moved off the Island and demolished the brewery to prevent any competition on the Island. Labatt brewed Lucky out of Edmonton, Alberta in the same brewery where they produced Budweiser for all of Western Canada, and it is still brewed to this day.

Packaging

Stubby bottles 
Lucky Lager was once famous for its 11 oz stubby bottles featuring a rebus under the cap. Since the closure of the Tumwater brewery, this famous bottle has been discontinued.

Rebus caps 
Rebus puzzles use pictures to represent words or parts of words within a phrase. In the 1970s and 1980s, Lucky Lager, along with other brands controlled by beer magnate, Paul Kalmanovitz, featured rebus puzzles on the underside of their bottle caps to engage consumers.

Label 
Lucky Lager's marketing strategy also relied strongly on its packaging and label. In 1939, the Pacific Advertising Club Association granted Lucky Lager the highest award for the most distinctive beer package. The history of the label started with the design of the very distinctive red cross, with a circle in the center with the printed date of the beer, and the words "Lucky Lager" printed on both arms of the cross. The label was distinctive from traditional beer brands because of its simplicity and how easy it was to remember. It covered the whole surface of the can and, when piled, the combination of the crosses culminated in a sophisticated design. This design by Charles Stafford Duncan, the art director of the McCann Erickson advertising agency in San Francisco, also won the Altman Prize of the National Academy of Design.

The original label for Lucky Lager has seen many changes. The large red cross was made less prominent in the 1950s, but it remained on the labels and on advertising. The label was redesigned and the cross was again made smaller in 1962, although it was still the design's focus. A subsequent design in the late 60s got rid of the cross entirely and replaced it with a large cursive "L". With the rise of premium beer, led by Coors and Millers, Lucky Lager changed the logo in an attempt to maintain itself relevant in the beer market. With the subsequent decline and end of Lucky Lager in the US, the beer continues to operate with an ever-changing identity under the control of Labatt, owners of the brand rights in Canada.

Advertising

Original branding 
The original advertising for the Lucky Lager brand centered on the large X emblem present on packaging and other marketing material, including the "Bonded Beer" slogan and age-dated beer canning. Lucky Lager was the first beer to include the date the beer was brewed on the can. This remained a central tenet of its advertising through the middle 1960s

One of the more unusual promotions was the "Talking Package". It was a robot made of Lucky Beer containers: its body was a beer barrel, the neck, arms and legs were made of beer cans, and the head and feet were large bottles. One hand held a beer bottle as well. Inside was a microphone and a speaker. An operator hid nearby where he could see the people in front of the robot. Spectators could go up to the "talking package" and ask him questions about Lucky Lager and the Lucky robot would respond.

"It’s Lucky when you live in..." 
During the early 1950s, one of the key brand slogans was "It's Lucky when you live in California." It was seen on many billboards throughout California. As its distribution area grew, it became "It's Lucky when you live in America".

Labatt Brewing Company declared Cumberland, British Columbia to be the "Luckiest Town in Canada" in early 2002 due to its incredible rate of consumption.

Partnerships, sponsorships, and endorsers 
Lucky Lager provided endorsements and advertising for the San Francisco Seals throughout the 1930s, 40s, and 1950s. It garnered endorsements from Boston Pops conductor Arthur Fiedler and tennis star Jack Kramer during the 1950s.

Lucky also sponsored a well-loved popular music radio show called "Lucky Lager Dance Time". It ran with local DJs but the same playlist across California, so people could listen to the same music while they were driving. It also sponsored various sports recaps and other programs.

In the 1960s, Lucky Lager Brewing Company sponsored the Lucky International Open. Lucky's 1963 McCann Erickson ad campaign included the song "Go Lively: Get Lucky", by Richard Adler.[4]

Jingles, commercials, and print ads 
Lucky, like most other beer brands at the time, was present both on the radio, in print, and on TV. Early commercials for Lucky featured a vaudeville song and dance number and labeled Lucky as "Aged Just Right". Other ads featured cartoons detailing the improvements of Lucky Draft over other light beers and emphasizing the aging and superior quality of Lucky. Most of their ads before 1965 featured imagery that is iconic with the West (beaches, ranches, and mountains). Much of this imagery was echoed in their print advertising.

In popular culture 
In the 1956 film "Please Murder Me", a Lucky Lager billboard is in the background in one scene. In the 1961 film The Exiles, the characters are drinking Lucky Lager and local liquor stores are advertising the sale of Lucky Lager. The brand also appears in the bar room brawl scene in the 1968 movie The Devil's Brigade. In the 1965 film, A Patch of Blue, a Lucky beer truck appears in one scene. In the 1968 film "Vixen!", Lucky Lager is being consumed in the backwoods of British Columbia. Jack Nicholson's character drinks Lucky Lager during the 1970 movie Five Easy Pieces. In the film The Bad News Bears (1976), the Walter Matthau character gives the team Lucky Lagers to celebrate. Lucky Lager is featured in the 1982 Black Flag video "TV Party". In the television show Greg the Bunny, a Lucky Lager sign appears in the 'Rabbit Redux' episode. Cans of Lucky Lager appear in the film The Van, being sold out of a cooler at a van show. In the 1993 film Kalifornia, Lucky Lager is the favorite drink of the Brad Pitt character "Early Grace".

The brand is also alluded to in Luis Valdez's play Los Vendidos in reference to the kinds of foods, drinks, and drugs the Mexican Johnny Pachuco model runs on: "You can keep Johnny running on hamburgers, Taco Bell tacos, Lucky Lager beer, Thunderbird wine, yesca. . ." (Valdez)

References

Further reading 

 Decamp, Bob. "It's Lucky When You Live in the West" Beer Cans and Brewery Collectibles (Feb/March 1997) 6–8.
 Hernon, Peter and Terry Ganey. Under the Influence: The Unauthorized Story of the Anheuser-Busch Dynasty. (New York: Avon Books, 1992)
 "General Brewing Corporation Will Enter West Field" (Reno) Nevada State Journal. (11 April 1934) 10.
 "General Brewing Management Plan, The" Modern Brewery (December 1934) 43–46.
 Novins, J. K. "General Brewing Corp. Begins Operations" Modern Brewery (March 1934) 52–54, 80–81.
 Novins, J. K. "Lucky Lager Centers Promotion on the Label" Modern Brewery (May 1939) 24–27, 66.
 Van Wieren, Dale P. American Breweries II (West Point, PA.: East Coast Breweriana Association, 1995) 17, 37, 372, 385.

External links 
 Tavern Trove reference for the closing date of the SLC brewery
 Labatt Regional Brands - Lucky Lager

American beer brands
Companies based in San Francisco